Louis is the French form of the Old Frankish given name Chlodowig and one of two English forms, the other being Lewis.

Etymology
The name Louis (through the intermediate form Clovis) derives from the Frankish name ᚺᛚᛟᛞᛟᚹᛁᚷ (in runic alphabet) or *Hlōdowik or *Hlōdowig (in Latin alphabet). Traditionally, this name is considered to be composed of two elements, deriving from both Proto-Germanic *hlūdaz ("loud, famous") and *wiganą ("to battle, to fight") respectively, resulting in the traditional practice of translating Clovis' name as meaning "famous warrior" or "famous in battle".

However, scholars have pointed out that Gregory of Tours consequently transcribes the names of various Merovingian royal names containing the first element as chlodo-. The use of a close-mid back protruded vowel (o), rather than the expected close back rounded vowel (u) which Gregory does use in various other Germanic names (i.e. Fredegundis, Arnulfus, Gundobadus, etc.) opens up the possibility that the first element instead derives from Proto-Germanic *hlutą ("lot, share, portion"), giving the meaning of the name as "loot bringer" or "plunder (bringing) warrior". This hypothesis is supported by the fact that if the first element is taken to mean "famous", then the name of Chlodomer (one of Clovis' sons) would contain two elements (*hlūdaz and *mērijaz) both meaning "famous", which would be highly uncommon within the typical Germanic name structure.

Variant forms
 
  
 
 Ancient Germanic: Chlodovech, Clodovicus, Ludovicus, Clovis, Hludowig
  (Loudovik)
 , Koldo
 , Loïc
 
  (Lyudovik)
 
 Chinese Simplified: 路易 (Lùyì)
 Chinese Traditional: 路易 (Lùyì)
 , Alojz
 , Alois, Luděk
 , Lodvig
 
 , Lodvig, Lodovig, Lutwidge
 , Luĉjo
 
 
 
  (Khlodvigi), ლუდვიგი (ludvigi), ლუდოვიკო(ludoviko), ლუი (lui)
 , Aloysius, Lutz
  (Loudovíkos), Λοΐζος(Loizos)
 
 Hindi: लुइस (Lu'is)     
 , Alajos
 
 , Louis, Ludowikus
 
 , Alvise, Gigi, Gigio, Gigino, Ginetto, Gino, Luigino, Vico
 Japanese: ルイ(Rui)
 Korean: 루이 (Lui), 루이스 (Luiseu)
 
 , Ludis, Ludvigs, Luijs, Luiss, Luī, Aloizs, Aloiss
 , Aloyzas, Liudas
  (Ludvig), Луј (Luj), Људевит (Ljudevit)
 Medieval Occitan: Aloys, Aloysius
 , Lodve
 Occitan: Loís
 Persian: لوئیس
 , Alojzy
  (Luiz is an archaic form), Luisinho
 Provençal: Louïs, Louei, Louvis
 Punjabi: ਲੂਯਿਸ (Lūyis)
 
  (Lyudovik)
 Scottish Gaelic: Luthais
 Sicilian: Luiggi, Ludovicu
  (Luj), Људевит (Ljudevit)
 , Alojz
 , Alojzij, Ludvik
 , Ludovico
 , Ludde
 Tamil: லூயிஸ் (Lūyis)
 Telugu: లూయిస్ (Lūyis)
 Thai: หลุยส์ (H̄luys̄̒)
  (Lyudovyk)
 Welsh: Lewis, Lewys

Feminine variants 
 Arabic: لويز
 Belarusian: Луіза (Luiza)
 Chinese Simplified: 路易丝 (Lùyìsī)
 Chinese Traditional: 路易絲 (Lùyìsī)
 Croatian: Alojzija
 Danish: Louise
 Dutch: Louisa, Louise, Ludovica
 English: Louise, Louisa, Lou, Louella, Lula, Luella, Lulu
 Estonian: Loviise 
 Finnish: Loviisa
 French: Lou, Louise, Louisette
 German: Aloisia, Louisa, Luise, Lulu, Luisa
 Greek: Λουίζα (Louíza)
 Gujarati: લુઇસ (Lu'isa)
 Hebrew: לואיז
 Hindi: लुइस (Lu'isa)
 Hungarian: Lujza
 Italian: Lodovica, Ludovica, Luigia, Luisa, Gigia, Gina, Ginetta, Luigina, Luisella
 Japanese: ルイーザ (Ruīza), ルイ (Rui)
 Kannada: ಲೂಯಿಸ್ (Lūyis)
 Korean: 루이사 (Luisa)
 Lithuanian: Liudvika
 Maori: Ruiha
 Macedonian: Лујза (Lujza), Лојза (Lojza)
 Mongolian: Луиза (Luiza)
 Nepali: लुइस (Lu'isa)
 Norwegian: Lovise
 Persian: لوئیس
 Polish: Ludwika, Luiza 
 Portuguese: Luísa, Luiza
 Romanian: Luiza
 Serbian: Луиз (Luiz)
 Slovak: Alojzia
 Slovene: Alojzija
 Spanish: Luisa, Luisana, Luisel, Luisina, Luisita
 Swedish: Lovisa, Lova
 Tamil: லூயிஸ் (Lūyis)
 Telugu: లూయిస్ ( Lūyis)
 Thai: หลุยส์ (H̄luys̄̒)
 Ukrainian: Луїза (Luyiza)
 Urdu: لوئیس

Arts and entertainment
 Louis (singer) (1952–2011), Serbian singer
 Louis Akin (1868–1913), American painter and illustrator
 Lou Albano (1933–2009), Italian wrestler, manager and actor
 Louis Anderson (1953–2022), American stand-up comedian and actor
 Louis Armstrong (1901–1971), American jazz musician
 Louis C.K. (born 1967), American comedian
 Louis Cachet (born 1973), Norwegian musician 
 Louis Calabro (1926–1991), Italian American orchestral composer
 Louis Calhern (1895–1956), American actor
 Louis Cheung (born 1980), Hong Kong singer, songwriter, and actor
 Louis Clark (born 1947), English musical arranger and keyboard player
 Louis Cole (musician), American musician
 Lou Costello (1906–1959), American comedian
 Louis Daguerre (1787–1851), French artist and photographer
 Louis Deland (1772–1823), Swedish ballet dancer, singer, actor, choreographer and ballet master
 Lou Dobbs (born 1945), CNN anchor
 Lou Ferrigno (born 1951), American bodybuilder and actor
 Louis Gallodier (1734–1803), ballet master and choreographer
 Louis Gossett Jr. (born 1936), American actor
 Louis Johnson (bassist) (1955–2015), American bass player and singer, member of The Brothers Johnson
 Louis Jordan (1908–1975), pioneering American jazz, blues and rhythm & blues musician and songwriter
 Louis Jourdan (1921–2015), French actor
 Louis Jouvet (1887–1951), French actor and director
 Louis I. Kahn (1901–1974), American architect
 Louis Koo (born 1970), Hong Kong actor, singer and film producer
 Louis L'Amour (1908–1988), American author of Western fiction
 Louis Logic, American underground rapper
 Louis Masreliez (1748–1810), French-born Swedish painter and interior designer
 Louis Prima (1910–1978), Italian American jazz and swing musician and trumpeter
 Louis Rukeyser (1933–2006), American economic commentator
 Lou Diamond Phillips (born 1962), American actor
 Lou Rawls (1933–2006), American musician
 Lou Reed (1942–2013), American musician
 Louis Sachar (born 1954), American author of children's books
 Louis Spohr (1784–1859), German composer
 Louis Sullivan (1856–1924), American architect
 Louis Theroux (born 1970), British television broadcaster
 Louis Tomlinson (born 1991), English pop singer; one-fifth of English-Irish boy band One Direction. (Current solo artist)
 Louis Van Lint (1909–1986), Belgian artist
 Louis Vuitton (designer) (1821–1892), French fashion designer
 Louis Wain (1860–1936), British artist who drew cats
 Louis Walsh (born 1952), Irish entertainment manager
 Louis Yuen (born 1967), Hong Kong actor

Politics
 Louis A. Bloom (1900–1988), Pennsylvania State Representative and Judge
 Louis Borno, President of Haiti during United States occupation of Haiti
 Louis Brandeis (1856–1941), American Supreme Court justice and Zionist leader
 Louis Philippe de Bombelles, Austrian count and diplomat
Louis Conradt, politician from Texas, investigated by To Catch a Predator
Louis DeJoy (born 1957), American businessman and current postmaster general of the United States
 Louis René Édouard, cardinal de Rohan (1734–1803), French religious leader and politician
 Louis Farrakhan (born 1933), Afro-American social leader
 Louis De Geer (1818–1896), Sweden's first prime minister; baron, statesman and writer
Gerhard Louis De Geer, known as Louis De Geer (1854–1935), Swedish prime minister
 Louis "Louie" Gohmert (born 1953), Texas politician and U.S. Congressman
 Louis Lucien Hunter, Sri Lankan civil servant and politician
 Louis Alphonse Koyagialo, Prime minister of the Democratic Republic of Congo
 Louis St. Laurent (1882–1973), Canadian politician who served as the 12th prime minister of Canada
 Louis Lingg (1864–1887), German anarchist arrested after Haymarket Square bombing
 Louis Michel (born 1947), Belgian politician
 Louis Riel (1844–1885), Canadian politician, a founder of Manitoba, and leader of the Métis
 Louis Eugène Roy, President of Haiti
 Louis L. Winston (1784–1824), justice of the Supreme Court of Mississippi

Royalty

Holy Roman Emperors and Kings of Germany
 Louis the Pious, Emperor and King of the Franks from 814 to his death.
 Louis II, Holy Roman Emperor, eldest son of the emperor Lothair I
 Louis III, Holy Roman Emperor, maternal grandson of the emperor Louis II
 Louis the German (Louis II), the third son of the emperor Louis the Pious and his first wife
 Louis the Child (Louis III), the last true Carolingian ruler of East Francia
 Louis IV, Holy Roman Emperor

Kings of France
 Louis the Pious, Emperor and King of the Franks from 814 to his death
 Louis the Stammerer, the eldest son of Charles the Bald and Ermentrude of Orléans
 Louis III of France, king of Western Francia
 Louis IV of France, king of France from 936 to 954
 Louis V of France, son of the Frankish King Lothair and his wife Emma
 Louis VI of France, King of France from 1108 to 1137
 Louis VII of France, King of France from 1137 to 1180
 Louis VIII of France, King of France from 1223 to 1226
 Louis IX of France, King of France from 1226 to 1270
 Louis X of France, King of France from 1314 to 1316
 Louis XI of France, King of France from 1461 to 1483
 Louis XII of France, King of France from 1498 to 1515
 Louis XIII of France, King of France and Navarre from 1610 to 1643
 Louis XIV of France, King of France and Navarre from 1643 to 1715
 Louis XV of France, King of France and Navarre from 1715 to 1774
 Louis XVI of France, King of France and Navarre from 1774 until 1791
 Louis XVII of France, the son of King Louis XVI of France and Marie Antoinette
 Louis XVIII of France, King of France and Navarre from 1815 to 1824
 Louis XIX of France, King of France and Navarre for twenty minutes in 1830 before his abdication

Other French royalty
 Louis I, Duke of Bourbon, Duke of Bourbon
 Louis II, Duke of Bourbon, Duke of Bourbon
 Louis I de Bourbon, prince de Condé, Prince of Condé
 Louis II de Bourbon, prince de Condé, Prince of Condé
 Louis III, Prince of Condé, Prince of Condé
 Louis Henri, Duke of Bourbon (also known as Louis IV, prince de Condé)
 Louis Joseph de Bourbon, prince de Condé (also known as Louis V Joseph)
 Louis Henry II, Prince of Condé (also known as Louis VI Henri)
 Louis Armand I, Prince of Conti, Prince of Conti
 Louis Armand II, Prince of Conti, Prince of Conti
 Louis François I, Prince of Conti, Prince of Conti
 Louis François II, Prince of Conti, Prince of Conti
 Louis V, Elector Palatine

Kings of Etruria
 Louis I of Etruria, King of Etruria from 1801 to 1803
 Louis II of Etruria, King from 1803–1807, also Duke of Lucca (1824–1847) and Duke of Parma (1847–1849)

Kings of Holland
 Louis I Bonaparte, King of Holland from 1806 to 1810
 Louis II Bonaparte, King of Holland in 1810, also Grand Duke of Berg

Kings of Hungary
 Louis the Great, (Louis I of Hungary) Apostolic King of Hungary, Dalmatia, Croatia, Rama, Serbia, Galicia, Lodomeria, Jerusalem and Sicily from 1342, King of Poland from 1370
 Louis II of Hungary and Bohemia, King of Bohemia and Hungary from 1516 to 1526

King of Portugal
 Louis I of Portugal (1838–1889), succeeded to his older brother Peter V in 1861

King of Spain
 Louis I of Spain, the eldest son of Philip V of Spain by his first Queen consort Maria Louisa of Savoy

Princes of Monaco
 Louis I, Prince of Monaco
 Louis II, Prince of Monaco, Sovereign Prince of Monaco from 26 June 1922 until 9 May 1949

Princes of the United Kingdom
 Prince Louis of Wales (born 2018), son of William, Prince of Wales, and Catherine, Princess of Wales, grandson of King Charles III

Dukes and Kings of Bavaria
 Louis I, Duke of Bavaria
 Louis II, Duke of Bavaria
 Louis III, Duke of Bavaria
 Louis IV, Holy Roman Emperor, also Duke of Bavaria
 Louis V, Duke of Bavaria, also Margrave of Brandenburg as Louis I
 Louis VI, Duke of Bavaria, also Margrave of Brandenburg as Louis II
 Louis VII, Duke of Bavaria
 Louis VIII, Duke of Bavaria
 Louis IX, Duke of Bavaria
 Louis X, Duke of Bavaria
 Louis I King of Bavaria from 1825 to 1848
 Louis II King of Bavaria from 1864 to 1886, the Märchenkönig (Fairy tale king)
 Louis III, Regent from 1912 to 1913, King from 1913 to 1918 (last king of Bavaria)

Grand-Duke of Berg
 Louis, Grand Duke of Berg from 1809 to 1813, also King of Holland as Louis II

Grand-Dukes of Hesse
 Louis I, Grand Duke of Hesse
 Louis II, Grand Duke of Hesse
 Louis III, Grand Duke of Hesse
 Louis IV, Grand Duke of Hesse

Duke of Savoy
 Louis, Duke of Savoy, Duke of Savoy from 1440 to 1465

Duke of Württemberg
 Louis Eugene, Duke of Württemberg

Landgrave of Hesse-Darmstadt
 Louis IX, Landgrave of Hesse-Darmstadt

Science and innovation
 Louis Blériot (1872–1936), French aviator and inventor
 Louis Braille (1809–1852), inventor of braille
 Louis de Broglie (1892–1987), French physicist and Nobel Prize laureate
 Louis Ignarro (1941) American pharmacologist and Nobel Prize laureate
 Louis Leakey (1903–1972), British paleontologist
 Louis Lliboutry, French-Chilean glaciologist
 Louis Mink (1921–1983), American philosopher of history
 Louis Pasteur (1822–1895), French microbiologist and chemist, discoverer of the principles of vaccination, microbial fermentation and pasteurization
 Louis Schoonhoven (born 1931), Dutch entomologist
 Louis Slotin (1910–1946), Canadian physicist and chemist
 Louis Wirth (1897–1952), American sociologist

Sports
 Louis Almond (born 1992), English footballer
 Louis Babrow (1915–2004), South African rugby union player
 Louis Baise (born 1927), South African Olympic wrestler
 Lou Boudreau (1917–2001), American, Hall of Fame baseball player and manager
 Lou Brock (born 1939), American baseball player
 Louis Bullard (1956–2010), American football player
 Louis Campbell (born 1979), American basketball player
 Louis Chevrolet (1878–1941), racing driver and the founder of the Chevrolet Motor Car Company
 Lou Creekmur (1927-2009), American football player and Pro Football Hall of Fame class of 1996
 Louis Unser (1896-1979), American race car driver and Hillclimb racer
 Louis Delétraz (born 1997), Swiss race car driver
 Louis Clarke (1901–77), American Olympic track champion
 Louis Ford (footballer) (born 1914), Welsh footballer
 Louis van Gaal (born 1951), Dutch footballer and manager
 Lou Gehrig (1903–1941), American baseball player
 Louis Jani (born 1957), Canadian judoka
 Louis Kaplan (1901–1970), nicknamed "Kid Kaplan", Russian-born American world champion Hall of Fame featherweight boxer
 Louis King (basketball) (born 1999), American basketball player
 Louis Klotz (born 1921), nicknamed "Red", American NBA basketball player and owner of the Washington Generals and New York Nationals
 Louis Pilot (born 1940), Luxembourgian footballer and manager
 Louis Riddick (born 1969), American football broadcaster and former player
 Louis Rubenstein (1861–1931), Canadian world champion Hall of Fame figure skater
 Louis Saha (born 1978), French footballer
 Lewis Hamilton (born 1985), English racing driver
 Louis Smith (gymnast) (born 1989), English gymnast

Others
 Louis Edmund Blaze (1861–1951), Sri Lankan Burgher educationist, founder of Kingswood College, Kandy, Sri Lanka
 Louis Botha (1862–1919), South African politician, first Prime Minister of the Union of South Africa, one of the principal commanders of the Second Boer War
 Louis Brouillard (1921–2018), American Catholic priest
 Louis Congo (c. 1725), emancipated slave, appointed public executioner of Louisiana
 Louis Le Duff, French billionaire businessman
 Louis Franchet d'Espèrey, French general during World War I
 Louis V. Gerstner Jr. (born 1942), chairman and CEO of IBM
 Louis Antoine Godey (1804-1878), American editor and publisher
 Louis Jolliet (1645–1700), French explorer, one of the first Europeans to reach the northern part of the Mississippi River
 Louis Kealoha, former Chief of the Honolulu Police Department and convicted felon
 Louis-Frédéric Lescure (1904–1993), French industrialist
 Louis Mountbatten (1900–1979), last Viceroy of India and first Governor-General of independent India, cousin of Queen Elizabeth II
 Louis Palander (1842–1920], Swedish naval officer
 Louis Pio (1841–1894), Danish political figure
 Louis (parrot), parrot from Victoria, British Columbia, Canada, well-provided for by owner's will after her death in 1949
 Louis H. Pollak (1922–2012), American district court judge and dean of Yale Law School and the University of Pennsylvania Law School
 Louis Pope (b.1947), American businessman
 Louis Ruquoy, Chief of Staff of the Belgian Army during the second part of the First World War
 Louis Sabunji (1838–1931), Syriac Catholic priest and journalist
 Louis B. Schwartz (1913–2003), American law professor at the University of Pennsylvania Law School
 Louis Spencer, Viscount Althorp (born 1994), heir apparent to earldom. 
 Louis Zamperini (1917–2014), American World War II veteran, Christian evangelist and an Olympic distance runner, best known for being a Japanese POW survivor.

Fictional characters
 Dr. Louis Faraday, a character in the 1986 American science fiction adventure movie Flight of the Navigator
 Louis, a character in the American sitcom television series Kate & Allie
 Louis, a protagonist of the Japanese manga series Beastars
 Louis de Pointe du Lac, character in the Vampire Chronicles novels by Anne Rice
 Louis the Alligator, a character from the animated film The Princess and the Frog
 Louie Duck, Disney character
 Louis Gara, a character in the 2013 American black comedy crime movie Life of Crime
 Louis Huang, character played by Randall Park in Fresh Off the Boat
 Louis Litt, character played by Rick Hoffman in Suits
 Louis Michaelson, a character played by Fred Savage in the 1986 American fantasy drama film The Boy Who Could Fly
 Louis Tully, character played by Rick Moranis in Ghostbusters and Ghostbusters II
 Louis Wu, character in the Ringworld books by Larry Niven
 Louis, one of the protagonists of Left 4 Dead

See also
 Lewis
 Lois
 Louis (disambiguation)
 Louise
 Louie
 Ludwig
 Luis

References

English masculine given names
French masculine given names